The Western Air Command (WAC) is the regional command of Indian Air Force headquartered in New Delhi. It is the largest and most important Air Command of the IAF, comprising sixteen Air Force Bases (AFBs), and is responsible for aerial defence of North India.

WAC's Area of Responsibility extends from Jammu and Kashmir to Rajasthan, also covering the states of Himachal Pradesh, Punjab, Haryana, New Delhi and Western Uttar Pradesh.

History 
WAC was raised in 1947 as the No. 1 Operational Group which controlled all the flying units of Indian Air Force, including the flying training units. On July 22, 1949, the No. 1 Operational Group was re-designated as the Operational Command. In 1958, the rank of the Commanding Officer of Operational Command was upgraded from Air Commodore to Air Vice Marshal and later, to the rank of Air Marshal.

In the aftermath of the India-China War of 1962, the IAF began the process of demarcation of specific areas of responsibility, and splitting up of the flying Corps into various operational air commands. On June 10, 1963, Operational Command assumed its present name of Headquarters Western Air Command.

Due to its geographical location in the crucial North Indian region, surrounded by Pakistan to the west and China to the East, WAC has been involved in all major operations in India since independence, and has been the hub-centre of all operational activities during any operation.

The IAF Western Air Command is engaged in air logistics operations to supply troops deployed at Siachen Glacier. These operations are undertaken from the Siachen Forward Air Base, using Mi-17, HAL Dhruv and HAL Cheetah helicopters.

The Western Air Command has been the major operational command involved in most of the war fought by India, including the Indo-Pakistani War of 1947, Sino-Indian War in 1962, the Indo-Pakistani War of 1965, Indo-Pakistan War of 1971, Operation Pawan (1986) in Sri Lanka and Operation Safed Sagar during the 1999 Kargil War.

Organization 

Western Air Command is headquartered at Subroto Park, New Delhi. It is headed by an Air Officer Commanding-in-Chief, WAC, of the rank of Air Marshal. Under the C-in-C come the Senior Air Staff Officer, Senior Maintenance Staff Officer and Senior Officer in Charge of Administration, who are of the ranks of Air Vice Marshal or Air Marshal. They handle the day-to-day activities of the Command and act as the liaison between the various Wings.

WAC also has a forward headquarters located at Chandigarh near the Army's Western Command. There is an Air Operations Group, formed in 1982, located at Udhampur, Jammu and Kashmir, which is principally tasked with the defence of Jammu & Kashmir and Ladakh.

No. 224 Squadron, Indian Air Force was raised in July 1983 at Adampur and operated with WAC until its disbandment in 2007.
Squadrons include:

Air Bases 

WAC has been assigned 10 permanent Air Force Stations (AFS)and 6 Forward Base Support Units (FBSUs), including the strategic Forward Air Base at Siachen. Along with these, WAC also has over 200 operational bases, Advance Landing Grounds (ALGs), and Operational centres placed under its command.

The Air Force Stations/Wings under WAC control are:

Forward Base Support Units (FBSU)

List of Commanders

References

External links 
 Western Air Command at IAF Official Website.
Bharat Rakshak, IAF Command Structure

Commands of the Indian Air Force
Military units and formations established in 1947
Military units and formations of the Indian Air Force
1947 establishments in India